Vijay Samnotra is an Indian civil servant and former international career diplomat who served in the United Nations. He formerly served as Head of United Nations Environment Programme in India, and Senior Adviser to the United Nations Resident Coordinator on Climate Change and Urbanization.

Early life
Mr Vijay Samnotra's parents and grandparents were refugees from erstwhile West Pakistan. For him, the partition of India and the violent upheavals that preceded and led to the deaths and destitution of lakhs of Hindus and Sikhs is an epochal moment in our history that has been ignored by our national leaders for its impact on the lives of ordinary people who became its innocent victims. He feels very strongly the need to rescue individual experiences from the narratives encouraged by successive governments at the centre. Unfortunately, memories – eyewitness accounts- of the survivors of this tragedy are now fast receding into oblivion. In addition, there are attempts by some contemporary historians and politicians to diminish the suffering of Hindus and Sikhs while presenting a revisionist view of history – shifting responsibility for this holocaust away from its perpetrators.

According to him, the most glaring omission is the total absence of efforts by national governments to officially memorialize this traumatic event. Also, there has been no attempt to explore the consequences of the violence on women, children and Dalits. He strongly believes that the act of sharing individual trauma and suffering of the partition is important for us - the Indian citizens to face squarely and learn lessons from this tragic event while its memories are still fresh in our minds. He succeeded in prevailing upon the present government to commemorate 14 August every year as the "Day of Remembrance for the Victims of the Horrors of the Partition".

Career
Samnotra joined the Central Secretariat Service after qualifying through the Civil Services Examination. He served as Under Secretary to Government of India and later served as Private Secretary to then Minister of State Maneka Gandhi. He later resigned from civil service and joined the United Nations.

He served in the United Nations for 25 years and worked in United Nations Office at Nairobi and United Nations Environment Programme. He also worked as speech writer to two Under-Secretary-Generals of the United Nations and in that capacity, he assisted in conceptualising the themes and information campaigns around the World Environment Days as well as of the annual "Clean Up the World" campaigns.

In the year 2016, he established the India Country Office of UNEP in Delhi. As a Senior Adviser to the United Nations Resident Coordinator on Climate Change and Urbanization, he also contributed to building collaborative projects and programmes for other autonomous associate agencies of the UN. The Bali Strategic Plan on Capacity Building and Technology Transfer for quality assurance of UNEP's projects and programmes are well known.

Environmental management is strongly related to human behaviour at all levels of natural and human interactions. It promotes greater connectivity between ecosystems and societal performance. On a practical level, the inter-linkages initiative is based on the assumption that improving the implementation of existing environmental mechanisms does not necessarily require new instruments but, rather, a greater level of coherence among the tools already available. In this regard, Samnotra's contributions to provide Interlinkages that represents a time- and cost-effective approach to strengthening the existing systems of managing sustainable development is well noted.

Mr Samnotra has led and resolved the issues and concerns for supporting the agriculture sector of India and the world. He revealed that the negative impacts of agriculture on various ecosystem services have often led to large societal costs that are increasingly being felt on human well-being, including, for example, declines in water quality for downstream residents affecting their health, and declines in wetlands and coastal ecosystems.

In the multisector workshop of WHO, he advised developing policy frameworks for eradicating air pollution so as to minimize the environmental health risks in developing countries. He revealed in his reports that household air pollution is the second, and ambient air pollution is the seventh leading risk factor for diseases in India. Over 620 000 deaths and about 18 million Disability-Adjusted Life Years (DALYs) are attributable to Ambient Air Pollution in India, while over one million deaths and 31 million DALYs are attributable to Household Air Pollution in India.

As a Senior Adviser to the United Nations Resident Coordinator in India on Climate Change and Urbanization, he coordinated the project on Circular Economy in India leading to the publication of "Ahead of the Curve"; Drafted the plan to make the United Nations in India carbon neutral; Advised the UN Resident Coordinator on all issues relating to Climate Change and Urbanization issues in his interactions with the United Nations Secretary-General's Office; Drafted the UN-India partnership proposal on climate change, innovation and urbanisation.

Awards
1. INVC International Award for Environmental diplomacy

References

External links
 Directory of UN Environment Programme Executive Office (Archived) UNEP
 Multisectoral Workshop on Air Pollution WHO, UN
 Works in Progress 2003 United Nations University
 Mumbaiites gear up for 100th week of Versova beach cleanup, 7.2 million kg trash removed so far Hindustan Times
 Reducing Carbon Footprint and Waste Generation is the Need of the Hour, Says Indian Environmentalist News Central 24x7

Living people
Indian civil servants
Indian government officials
Central Secretariat Service officers
Indian diplomats
United Nations officials
United Nations diplomats
Speechwriters
St. Stephen's College, Delhi alumni
Delhi University alumni
Academic staff of Delhi University
1955 births